The Institutional Acts were the founding legislation of the Brazilian military dictatorship, which ruled from 1964 to 1985. The acts superseded the 1946 constitution, serving as justification for the dictatorship and a framework for major reforms without removing the constitution. There were 17 Institutional Acts and over 100 Complementary Acts, which elaborated on the former's general intent. The need for a legal framework between the acts led to the 1967 constitution. The acts, originally conceived as permanent reforms, became more impermanent upon its first constitutional amendment in 1969, after which the dictatorship ignored laws as it saw fit. The acts were canceled in the 1970s during the country's political opening.

References

Further reading 

 

Brazilian legislation
Emergency laws
Military dictatorship in Brazil